A rail replacement bus service uses buses to replace a passenger train service on a temporary or permanent basis. The train service that is replaced may be of any type such as light rail, tram, streetcar, commuter rail, regional rail or heavy rail, intercity passenger service. The rail service may be replaced if the line is closed because of rail maintenance, a breakdown of a train, a rail accident or a strike action or to simply provide additional capacity or if the rail service is not economically viable.

Terms for a rail replacement bus service include  bustitution (a portmanteau of the words "bus" and "substitution", or bustitute) and bus bridge. Substitution of rail services by buses can be unpopular and subject to criticism and so the term bustitution is often used pejoratively.

Examples

Australia

In Australia, a permanent or temporary rail replacement service change is often referred to as bustitution.

In November 1941, the Western Australian Government Railways introduced its first rail replacement service, which operated a service from Perth to Kojonup via Boddington. By 1949, there were 28 buses, and by 1959, there were more than 50.

The Sydney Metro Northwest line used human-driven single-deck buses late at night from Wednesdays to Sundays and operated a red Metro bus-like service with a frequency of approximately every 10 minutes until November 2019. That measure was in place since the line was deemed "ready" 10 months ahead of schedule.

On the Queensland Rail network, to relieve congestion on the single track Sunshine Coast line, the rail service is supplemented by a bus service operated by Kangaroo Bus Lines on weekdays between Caboolture and Nambour as route 649. NSW TrainLink, Transwa and V/Line all introduced extensive networks in New South Wales, Western Australia and Victoria in the 1970s and the 1980s that replaced regional trains.

Canada
Via Rail, the operator of the national passenger rail network, uses the term "bustitution" to refer to rail replacement with buses.

Czech Republic

Substitute bus transport is governed by the Road Traffic Act (111/1994 Coll.), which allows the operator of a national, regional, tram, trolleybus or special line to operate substitute transport for up to 90 days in the case of interrupted or temporarily-restricted traffic on the line without the requirement to apply for a bus line license and have approval of the line's schedule. The law also mandates vehicles used for substitute transport to be marked as such.

In municipal public transport, substitute transport often takes on the number of the line that it replaces, prefixed by the letter X, and the original line is detoured. In cities with trolleybus systems, rail replacement buses also occasionally used for substitute transport and is then called substitute trolleybus transport.

Ireland
As in the United Kingdom, buses have replaced rail services on closed lines. The most recent example can be found in County Wexford. where upon the suspension of rail services between Rosslare Europort and Waterford in 2010, Bus Éireann route 370 was introduced. However, the bus takes considerably longer than the train journey and fails to serve Waterford railway station.

Japan

Busses have replaced rail in Japan when rail service must be suspended because  of disaster, accident, economics, or engineering works. Notably, in some cases. those rail lines are closed permanently, and some of the former rail rights-of-way are converted into bus rights-of-way to provide grade-separated bus rapid transit service.

New Zealand
When train services operated by Transdev in Auckland train services are sometimes replaced by a bus, the resulting service is called Rail Bus. Historically, New Zealand Railways Road Services replaced many train routes with buses.

Sweden
While the reconstruction of Slussen, the western terminal of Saltsjöbanan, is in progress, trains on line 25 run only to Henriksdal, one station short of Slussen, with the segment between Slussen and Henriksdal served by a replacement bus 25B that is timed to match the train times at Henriksdal.

Sometimes, buses can be seen running on line 7, the Spårväg City tram line, even when trams are running normally.

In the night after 01:00, there is no service on the Stockholm Metro and the commuter rail, and night buses run along the line instead.

United Kingdom

During the British Railways Board's railway rationalisation in the 1960s, known as the Beeching cuts, bus substitution was an official policy for replacing train services on closed lines. The policy was largely unsuccessful, however, as the bus services were usually far slower than the train services that they replaced, and many passengers gave up on public transport altogether.

Rail replacement bus services have been used to operate parliamentary train services.

 When North London Railways services between Watford Junction and Croxley Green were withdrawn in March 1996, to avoid the legal complications and costs of actual closure, train services were replaced by buses. The service was withdrawn when the branch was formally closed in September 2003.
 After the withdrawal of Central Trains services between Stafford and Stoke-on-Trent, to facilitate the West Coast Main Line upgrade at the request of the Strategic Rail Authority in May 2003, BakerBus route X1 was introduced to serve Norton Bridge, Stone, Barlaston and Wedgwood stations. When the train service was reintroduced by London Midland in December 2008, only Stone regained a rail service, and the other stations continued to be served by route X1. In October 2017, the Department for Transport (DfT) declared Norton Bridge station closed but continued the partial funding of the replacement bus service until March 2019. As of 2019, Barlaston and Wedgwood stations continue to be served by D&G Bus replacement route 14. The DfT partly funds the contractual service while it seeks a solution to demands for the restoration of the train service. The bustitution existed for 16 years, as of 2019.

After the withdrawal of services by Arriva CrossCountry between Reading and Brighton in December 2008, the only passenger services on three short sections of line between Ealing Broadway and Wandsworth Road, a replacement weekly bus service was introduced. The service ceased in June 2013, after a formal closure process had been completed.

United States

Rail-replacement bus services occurred on a large scale after the dismantling of the street railway systems of many cities in North America in the mid-20th century. Replacement of existing rail services with buses after World War II is one of the largest reasons that so few US cities have rapid transit systems.

The temporary substitution of buses for trains may be done with Amtrak's Thruway Motorcoach service.

The G Line (formerly the Orange Line) of the Los Angeles Metro runs along a paved closed course on the easement from the original Southern Pacific Railroad Burbank line, which was later used by the Pacific Electric Railway. It may eventually be converted back to light rail with Measure M funding, but that is not currently scheduled to happen until around 2050.

Singapore
An incident occurred in Singapore on 7 July 2015 after a mass shutdown on the North South East West Lines after a power system failure. The operator SMRT and the rival SBS Transit did not activate bus bridging but made all buses free islandwide because of the sheer scale of the disruptions. The Land Transport Authority made travel free available for any bus services passing MRT stations that were affected during the train disruptions, and during a massive disruption affecting at least two lines, bus travel islandwide was made free.

Urban transit 
Rail-replacement bus services are common among urban rail transit systems, mainly because of unexpected service disruptions. For example, one of the effects of Hurricane Sandy in New York was that the New York City Subway required replacement bus service for several subway routes. As the subway runs 24/7/365, replacement bus service is also provided when subway lines were closed for regularly-scheduled maintenance and so interruptions in subway service require replacement bus service, even during off-peak hours.

Planning rail-replacement services in a high-patronage environment, such as a high-capacity rapid transit network, requires efficient use and management of time and resources to prevent major travel disruptions. Thats was exemplified by a July 2015 shutdown on the Toronto subway during rush hour from a communication system breakdown in which the Toronto Transit Commission opted not to use replacement buses, as "it wasn't possible to replace the entire subway's capacity with buses".

See also 

 
 Beeching cuts, an example of bus service replacing rail service
 Bus rapid transit
 Effects of the car on societies
 Rail trail
 Transport economics

References

External links 
 
 

Public transport
Bus terminology
Replacement bus service